The 2002 World Club Challenge was held on Friday, 1 February 2002, at the Alfred McAlpine Stadium, Huddersfield, England. The game was contested by Bradford Bulls and Newcastle Knights.

Background

Bradford Bulls
The 2001 Super League Grand Final was held on Saturday 13 October 2001, at Old Trafford, Manchester, UK. The game was contested by Bradford Bulls and Wigan Warriors.

Newcastle Knights
The 2001 NRL grand final was the conclusive and premiership-deciding game of the 2001 NRL season. It was contested by the Newcastle Knights (who had finished the regular season in 3rd place), and the Parramatta Eels (who had finished the regular season in 1st place), after both sides eliminated the rest of the top eight during the finals. The attendance of 90,414 was the third highest ever seen at a rugby league match in Australia.

Match summary

Teams

External links
2002 World Club Challenge at news.bbc.co.uk
2002 World Club Challenge at superleague.co.uk
2002 World Club Challenge at rugbyleagueproject.com

World Club Challenge
Bradford Bulls matches
Newcastle Knights matches
World Club Challenge
World Club Challenge
World Club Challenge